Dowruzan (also Romanized as Dowrūzān; also known as Darvazān, Derūzān, Dorūzān, and Dūrzān) is a village in Bayat Rural District, Nowbaran District, Saveh County, Markazi Province, Iran. At the 2006 census, its population was 132, in 37 families.

References 

Populated places in Saveh County